Gynandromyia seychellensis is a species of tachinid flies in the genus Gynandromyia of the family Tachinidae.

References

Diptera of Africa
Insects described in 1923
Taxa named by Mario Bezzi
Exoristinae